An orchestra is an instrumental ensemble usually composed of string, brass, and woodwind sections, sometimes with a percussion section.

Orchestra may also refer to:

 MSC Orchestra, a cruise ship built for MSC Cruises
 "Orchestra", a song by the British band The Servant
 "Orchestra", the 79th episode of the television show The Suite Life of Zack & Cody
 "Orchestra", the place where the chorus sings and dances in the theatre of ancient Greece
 Orchestra Control Engine, a suite of software components for the planning, development and deployment of real-time control applications for industrial machines and robots
 OW2 Orchestra, a WS-BPEL compliant web services orchestration solution
 Orchestra (album), a 1988 album by Eberhard Weber
 Orchestral Manoeuvres in the Dark, a British new wave music band, often abbreviated to Orchestral.

See also
 The Orchestra (disambiguation)